Qullqapampa (Quechua qullqa, qulqa deposit, storehouse, pampa a large plain, Hispanicized spellings Colcabamba, Colcapampa) is an archaeological site in Peru. It is situated in the Cusco Region, Cusco Province, San Sebastián District.

The National Institute of Culture declared the site a National Cultural Heritage of Peru by R.D.N. No. 1128/INC - 2005.

See also 
 Inkill Tampu
 Pumamarka
 Rumiwasi

References 

Archaeological sites in Peru
Archaeological sites in Cusco Region